General elections were held in Malta between 26 and 28 February 1955. The Malta Labour Party remained the largest party, winning 23 of the 40 seats.

Electoral system
The elections were held using the single transferable vote system.

Results

References

General elections in Malta
1955 in Malta
Malta
February 1955 events in Europe
1955 elections in the British Empire